The Tatra 815-7 (also known as Tatra 817, T817 or Tatra Force) is a heavy army logistics vehicle made by the Czech company Tatra produced since 2008. T817 is primarily intended for military operators and for specialist roles in civilian sector (with Tatra 158 Phoenix being the company's primary general purpose truck for civilian sector). The truck is made primarily with axle variations of 4×4, 6×6, 8×8 and 10×10. Other chassis variants up to 16x16 are also available.

History
Tatra 817 is a development of T-815 chassis, aimed for transportability by the most common NATO transport aircraft C-130 Hercules as well as ability to easily add armor plates for protection. Tatra took the engines and transmissions of the 815-6 model, the chassis T-815 has been modified and a completely new cab has been developed. 

In 2004 a prototype of model 4×4 appeared at Eurosatory and other defence and security trade shows. Several other prototypes were later built ranging from 6x6 to 10x10. The cabin is all-metal, tiltable, its construction allows easy additional armoring in various degrees of ballistic protection. Cab tightness allows the use of overpressure filtering. 

Tatra 817 standard trucks serve in the Army of the Czech Republic and the Slovak Armed Forces, while 817 chassis with specialist superstructures (e.g. artillery cannon, rocket launcher, armored recovery vehicle, etc.) serve also in many other countries. It is also used in the civilian sector, including in variants of a mobile cranes and a fire trucks.

Specifications 
 motor: air cooled, turbocharged Tatra T3C-928-90 V8
 displacement: 12,667 cc
 max. power :  @ 1800 rpm
 max. torque :  @ 1000 rpm
 top speed: 115 km/h
 fuel tank capacity: 420 l
 cruising range: 750 km
 angle of approach/departure: 45°/42°
 fording depth: 1,5 m

T817 chassis military applications
T817 uses traditional Tatra backbone tube chassis instead of the more usual truck ladder frame. The chassis is designed primarily for off-road application, which gives it a comparative advantage over primarily road-intended trucks that were modified for offroad use.

As such, Tatra Czech manufactured T817 chassis is being used as basis for a other specialist vehicles made in a number of countries.

APC and MRAP vehicles
The following armoured personnel carriers and mine-resistant ambush protected vehicles use T817 chassis:
 Ara made by Proforce.
 Autosan, also known as Taktyczny Pojazd Wielozadaniowy 4x4, made by Huta Stalowa Wola.
 Fahd 300 made by Arab Organization for Industrialization.
 Vega, also known as ATLAV 1, made by 
 Husar, Vega derivative version offered to Polish army
 Legion made by Isotrex Manufacturing FZE.
 al-Mared made by Jordan Manufacturing and Services Solutions.
 Nexter Titus, made by Nexter Systems and Tatra
 Patriot made by 
 al-Wahsh made by Jordan Light Vehicle Manufacturing LLC
 Wildcat made by Israel Military Industries

Self-propelled artillery
 ATMOS 2000 made by Elbit Systems (versions for Thailand and Zambia). 
 CAESAR made by Nexter Systems.
 T5-52 Condor made by Denel Land Systems.

Rocket systems
 Astros II made by Avibras.
 Bureviy made by Ukroboronprom.
 Neptune made by Luch Design Bureau.
 SPYDER made by Rafael Advanced Defense Systems.

References

External links
 Official site

T815-7
Cars of the Czech Republic
Military trucks
All-wheel-drive vehicles
Trucks of the Czech Republic
Military vehicles introduced in the 2000s